Indianism may refer to:
Indian nationalism
Indianism (arts),  a Brazilian literary and artistic movement
Indigenismo, a Latin American political movement in the mid twentieth-century
Indianist movement, a movement in American classical music
Indian English, a class of varieties of the English language spoken in India